Doug Macdonald (1941-2022) was a Scottish aviator of the Royal Navy's Fleet Air Arm. He was a Royal Navy Observer, and became an Air Warfare Instructor, serving in the 1960's on exchange assignment with the U.S. Navy at Miramar airbase in a programme which prefaced Topgun.

Early life and education 
James Douglas Ogilvie Macdonald, son of Ann (née Page) and Ronald Ogilvie Macdonald, was born on 1 June 1941, in Banchory, Aberdeenshire. He attended Lathallan School and Robert Gordon's in Aberdeen. In September 1960 Macdonald went to Dartmouth for training as a naval aviation cadet. While based in Yeovilton he met Faith Hulse, his future wife. Although they divorced, they had two children, five grandchildren and two great-grandchildren.

Career 

Macdonald joined the Royal Navy Observer School (750 Naval Air Squadron) in Malta to become a naval air observer (a navigator, a non-pilot aircrew officer). In Macdonald's role as an observer, he navigated in fighter jet planes as the "eyes of the fleet". His career included postings on the aircraft carriers HMS Eagle, HMS Centaur, and HMS Victorious. He was able to return to Scotland when stationed at Lossiemouth and Leuchars. 

Aboard HMS Ark Royal, Macdonald was an observer with 892 Naval Air Squadron, "a unit that was unique in British aviation history", as it was "destined to be the Fleet Air Arm's only front-line Phantom unit".  

Historian Rowland White said,"...in being an Observer rather than a Pilot going through the Air Warfare Instructors' Course (AWI), Macdonald was a rarity. As a Looker he had no direct control over the aircraft, but, in having responsibility for navigation and operating the weapons system, he controlled nearly everything else."   

Dick Lord, Macdonald's 764 NAS instructor at Lossiemouth,  

In the 1960's, Macdonald had an exchange appointment with the U.S. Navy, assigned to Miramar airbase in California, among a dozen elite aviators, all graduates of Lossiemouth's Air Warfare Instructors school of the Royal Navy's Fleet Air Arm. American pilots in Phantom jets had been losing dogfights with Vietnamese MiG 21s. 

According to White:

White said, "Through the instructors on exchange at Miramar the AWI's methods made their way into perhaps the most well-known programme in the history of naval aviation: Topgun." White described Macdonald as "...Air Warfare Instructor, Dougal Macdonald, a Scot with his own reputation for hard-nosed belligerence in the air". 

Years later, after watching the film Top Gun Macdonald sid, "The flying scenes in Top Gun were very well done. The Americans really did have call signs like Tom Cruise's, but the British lads had more of a sense of humour – my call sign was Haggis."

In 1985, after returning from the U.S., MacDonald achieved the rank of commander, and he served at Portland, Cornwall, Weymouth and in the Ministry of Defence offices in London. He retired to Bath in 1989. 

MacDonald served as a committee member of the Fleet Air Arm Officers Association, 1987–1996, and then he was the as administrative director until 2008. As Rowland White  researched Phoenix Squadron, he credited Macdonald as "tireless and inventive in his efforts to help me reach the people I needed to speak to" for interviews. 

Doug Macdonald died at home on 3 September 2022. His survivors included "siblings Elizabeth and Gavin, his children, grandchildren, great-grandchildren and partner of many years Joy Berthoud".

See also 

 Aerial warfare
 Naval aviation
 Navy Command (Royal Navy)

References

External links 
 Aerial Warfare Quotations

1941 births
2022 deaths
People educated at Lathallan School
People educated at Robert Gordon's College
20th-century Royal Navy personnel
Fleet Air Arm aviators
Royal Navy officers